Maharashtra State Highway 249 Also SH 249 is a state highway in Nagpur, Bhandara, and  Gondia Districts in the state of Maharashtra.  This state highway touches Katol, Savner, Parseoni, Ramtek, Tumsar,Tirora and  Gondia.

State Highway
State Highway 354 (Maharashtra)
State Highway 366 (Maharashtra)
State Highway 275 (Maharashtra)

Summary 

This road is  one of the important road in Nagpur District providing connectivity with  two National Highway National Highway 7 (India)(old numbering) and NH 69. This is also providing connectivity with Gondia city with Nagpur and passing through Tumsar and Tiroda.
Adani Power Plant near  Tiroda is also on  this highway.

Major junctions 

Connections 

Many villages, cities and towns in different districts are connecting by this state highway.
Katol
Savner
Parseoni
Ramtek
Tumsar 
Tirora and  
Gondia.

See also 
 List of State Highways in Maharashtra

References 

State Highways in Maharashtra
State Highways in Nagpur District